Triffic Films was a British animation company, based in Stony Stratford, a constituent town of Milton Keynes, Buckinghamshire, England.

Productions of note include I Am Not an Animal, 2D TV and various title sequences including Two Fat Ladies, The Catherine Tate Show and Have I Got News for You.

In November 2009, the company was merged into Baby Cow Productions, an independent comedy production company based in London.

References

Companies based in Milton Keynes
British animation studios